Nieuwkuijk is a village in the Dutch province of North Brabant. It is located in the municipality of Heusden, about 10 km west of 's-Hertogenbosch.

History 
The village was first mentioned in 1383 as Niewekuyc, and means "new settlement of Cuijk". The family of Cuijk used to own land in the area.

Castle Onsenoort was built in 1382 by the heer of the heerlijkheid Nieuwkuijk. In the 19th century, it became part of the Cistercian monastery Mariënkroon. The tower probably dates from the 14th century. The building of the monastery were built in 1910. The main building and gate were added between 1934 and 1935. In 2016, the abbey closed down. It is nowadays in use as a conference centre.

Castle d'Oultremont probably originates from the 15th century. In 1707, it became owned by the counts of d'Oultremont. The building burnt down in 1795, and was rebuilt in 1875. In 1989, it became part of the amusement park  and was painted pink. The amusement park went bankrupt, and the castle was restored in 2019, and the pink paint was removed.

Nieuwkuijk was home to 978 people in 1840. Nieuwkuijk was a separate municipality until 1935, when it became part of Vlijmen. In 1997, it became part of the municipality of Heusden.

Gallery

References

External links

Populated places in North Brabant
Former municipalities of North Brabant
Heusden